Twersky, Twerski, or Tverski is the surname of a pedigree of rebbes in the Chernobyl Hasidic dynasty. It was begun by the Grand Rabbi Menachum Nachum Twerski. People with this name include:

Twersky 
 David Twersky (journalist) (1950–2010), journalist
 David Twersky (Skverer Rebbe) (born 1940), spiritual leader of Skverer Hasidim
 Isadore Twersky (1930–1997) scholar of Rabbinic literature and Jewish philosophy
 Mayer Twersky (born 1960), rosh yeshiva at Rabbi Isaac Elchanan Theological Seminary
 Menachem Nachum Twersky, the rebbe of Chernobyl and early 18th-century founder of the Hasidic Twersky family
 Mordechai Twersky, Maggid of Chernobyl, Rabbi Menachem Nochum's son
 Moshe Twersky (1955?-2014), son of Isadore Twersky, head of the kollel in Yeshiva Toras Moshe 
 Shmuel Abba Twersky (1872–1947), Makarover Rebbe of Winnipeg, Canada
 Victor Twersky (1923–1998), physicist and IEEE Fellow renowned for his contributions to the multiple-scattering theory

Twerski 
 Aaron Twerski (born 1939), American lawyer and the Irwin and Jill Cohen Professor of Law at Brooklyn Law School, as well as a former Dean and professor of tort law at Hofstra University School of Law
 Aaron Twerski of Chernobyl (1784–1871), Hasidic rabbi
 Abraham J. Twerski (1930–2021), Hasidic rabbi and psychiatrist
 Michel Twerski (born 1939), Hasidic rabbi and composer.

Tversky 
Amos Tversky (1937–1996), cognitive and mathematical psychologist
Barbara Tversky, American cognitive psychologist

References 

Jewish surnames
Ukrainian-language surnames
Surnames of Ukrainian origin
Surnames of Israeli origin
Yiddish-language surnames